The 2004–05 LEN Euroleague was the 42nd edition of LEN's premier competition for men's water polo clubs. It ran from 29 September 2004 to 21 May 2005, and it was contested by thirty five teams from fifteen countries. CN Posillipo defeated defending champion Budapest Honvéd in the final to win its third title, while Pro Recco was third and Jug Dubrovnik fourth.

First qualifying round

Second qualifying round

Preliminary round

Group A

Group B

Group C

Group D

Knockout stage

Quarter-finals
The first legs were played on 30 March, and the second legs were played on 20 April 2005.

Final Four
Piscina Felice Scandone, Naples, Italy.

Final standings

See also 
 2004–05 LEN Trophy

References

LEN Champions League seasons
Champions League
2004 in water polo
2005 in water polo